The French cruiser Pothuau was an armoured cruiser built for the French Navy in the 1890s. She spent most of her active career in the Mediterranean before becoming a gunnery training ship in 1906. The ship participated in the Kamerun campaign early in World War I before she was transferred to the Red Sea and the Indian Ocean in 1916 where she patrolled and escorted convoys. Pothuau fruitlessly searched the Indian Ocean for the German commerce raider  in mid-1917. The ship resumed her previous role after the war until she was decommissioned in 1926 and sold for scrap three years later.

Design and description
The ship was fitted with a prominent plough-shaped bow and was considered a good sea boat. She had a crew of 21 officers and 434 enlisted men; assignment as a flagship added 5 officers and 29 more sailors.

The ship had two vertical triple-expansion steam engines, each driving a single  propeller.

Pothuaus main armament consisted of two 40-calibre  Modèle 1893 guns that were mounted in single-gun turrets, one each fore and aft of the superstructure. The ship's secondary armament comprised ten 40-calibre  Modèle 1893 guns, five on each broadside in casemates. For close-range anti-torpedo boat defense, she carried a dozen quick-firing (QF)  and eight QF  Hotchkiss guns.

Protecting the boiler rooms, engine rooms, and magazines below it was a thin splinter deck.

Construction and career

Pothuau, named after French admiral and politician Louis Pothuau, was ordered on 11 April 1893 from Forges et Chantiers de la Méditerranée. The ship was laid down on 25 May 1893 at their Granville shipyard and finally launched on 19 September 1895, after two unsuccessful attempts on 22 and 23 August. She was commissioned for sea trials on 17 August 1896, definitively commissioned on 8 June 1897 and accepted from the builder (fin de recettes) on 9 July.

Assigned to the Escadre du Nord (Northern Squadron), the ship represented France during Queen Victoria's Diamond Jubilee Fleet Review at Spithead in June 1897 and then conveyed the President of France, Félix Faure, from Dunkerque to Russia the following August. Pothuau was transferred to the Escadre de Méditerranée (Mediterranean Fleet) in 1898 where she became flagship of the Escadre Légere (Light Squadron). During the annual naval maneuvers in June–July 1900, the ship was the flagship of Contre-Amiral (Counter Admiral) Maréchal who was relieved by Contre-Amiral Caillard several months later. Around May 1904 the ship was relieved as the flagship of the Mediterranean Fleet's Cruiser Squadron and she was placed into reserve in mid-1905. Pothuau was recommissioned on 17 April 1906 to serve as a gunnery training ship and became flagship of the combined gunnery school under Contre-Amiral Le Bris in 1910. During this time the ship tested a fire-control system, and continued as a gunnery training ship through July 1914.

In early September the three were transferred to the area between Corsica and Italy to interdict German reservists sailing from Barcelona, Spain, to Genoa, Italy. The ship departed Toulon on 24 October to support the invasion of the German colony of Kamerun in Africa and remained there until relieved by the protected cruiser  on 21 June 1915. She arrived at Lorient on 19 July to begin an overhaul that lasted until 2 January 1916. Pothuau was then transferred to the Red Sea and Indian Ocean where she escorted Allied merchant ships and searched for German commerce raiders.

Together with the British seaplane tender , Pothuau sailed for the Indian Ocean to hunt for the German merchant raider Wolf on 10 March 1917.  The two ships searched the Laccadive Islands en route to Colombo, Ceylon, which they reached on 2 April. They then searched the Chagos Archipelago and the Maldive Islands and returned to Colombo without finding the German ship. On 17 May Pothuau began an brief overhaul at Saigon, French Indochina, before returning to the Mediterranean in September. Upon returning to Toulon, she underwent a short refit that lasted until 9 November that allowed her to use a kite balloon.

Pothuau resumed her previous role of gunnery training ship after the war; during this time her main gun turrets were replaced by experimental anti-aircraft guns. The ship was decommissioned on 12 June 1926 and stricken on 3 November 1927. She was sold for 2,017,117 francs on 25 September 1929 to be broken up.

Notes

References

External links

 Pothuau blueprints
 battleships-cruisers.co.uk

Cruisers of the French Navy
Ships built in France
1895 ships
World War I cruisers of France